The Hungarian-language surname Fekete literally means “black” and may refer to:

Ádám Fekete
 Andrew Fekete (artist)
 Andrew Fekete (cricketer), Australian cricketer
 Árpád Fekete
Attila Fekete (disambiguation)
Attila Fekete (fencer)
Attila Fekete (footballer)
Benedek Szabolcs Fekete, Hungarian Roman Catholic prelate
Brian Fekete
Gene Fekete
 István Fekete, Hungarian writer
 Jean-Daniel Fekete, French computer scientist
László Fekete (disambiguation)
László Fekete (footballer)
László Fekete (strongman)
Liz Fekete
Maria von Tasnady born Mária Tasnádi Fekete
 Michael Fekete, Israeli-Hungarian mathematician
Mihály Fekete, Hungarian actor, screenwriter and film director
Nicholas Fekete
Róbert Fekete
Szilveszter Fekete

Hungarian-language surnames